Ralf Buchheim (born 10 October 1983 in Lebus) is a German sport shooter. At the 2012 Summer Olympics he competed in the Men's skeet, finishing in 10th place. The sports shooter Michael Buchheim is his father.

References

German male sport shooters
Living people
Olympic shooters of Germany
Shooters at the 2012 Summer Olympics
Shooters at the 2016 Summer Olympics
1983 births
People from Märkisch-Oderland
Shooters at the 2015 European Games
European Games competitors for Germany
Universiade medalists in shooting
Universiade silver medalists for Germany
Medalists at the 2011 Summer Universiade
Sportspeople from Brandenburg
20th-century German people
21st-century German people